Dunsfold Aerodrome (former ICAO code EGTD) is an unlicensed airfield in Surrey, England, near the village of Cranleigh. It extends across land in the villages of Dunsfold and Alfold.

It was built by the Canadian Army and civilian contractors as a Class A bomber airfield for Army Co-operation Command. It was commanded by the Royal Canadian Air Force from 1942 to 1944 and was known as Royal Canadian Air Force Station Dunsfold. Under RAF control it was RAF Dunsfold.

Post-war it was used by Hawker Siddeley and then its successor British Aerospace.

From 2002 to 2020, it was used as the main site of the BBC show Top Gear.

History

Construction and military use
Canadian engineers were charged with the construction of the aerodrome. Such projects had previously taken up to a year to complete and this site was complicated by the two hundred acres of woodland that first had to be cleared. The Canadian sappers had access to large-scale earth moving equipment from North America obtained under Lend-Lease arrangements. The Canadians also used pipe-pushing apparatus to place explosives under trees thereby facilitating their rapid removal. As a result the aerodrome was completed in just six months.

The first squadrons based at the aerodrome were 400, 414 and 430 Squadrons, RCAF, equipped with Curtiss Tomahawks and North American Mustangs. They were followed by the North American Mitchell Mk II medium bombers of No. 139 Wing RAF, consisting of 98 and 180 Squadrons RAF, and 320 Squadron (formed from Dutch Naval Aviation Service personnel). When 139 Wing departed for the continent in the autumn of 1944, 83 Group Support Unit (later 83 Group Disbandment Centre) arrived with Spitfires, Typhoons and Tempests. After the war the airfield was used by the RAF to repatriate prisoners of war.

Dunsfold was declared inactive by the RAF in 1946 but was then used by Skyways Ltd, with Avro York, Avro Lancastrian, Douglas C-54 Skymaster, de Havilland Dragon Rapide and de Havilland Dove aircraft. Skyways' operations included support of the Berlin Airlift. Skyways also refurbished ex-RAF Spitfires and Hawker Hurricanes for the Portuguese Air Force.

The following units were here at some point:

Post-war use
In 1950, The Hawker Aircraft Company acquired the lease of the site. Dunsfold became internationally known for development of the Hunter jet fighter; limited numbers of Sea Hawks were also produced and Sea Furies were refurbished. Airwork Ltd leased two hangars from 1953 to 1958 for the refurbishment of North American F-86 Sabres and Supermarine Attackers.

In October 1960, the then Hawker Siddeley flight tested its Hawker P.1127 prototype, the development aircraft that led to the Hawker Siddeley Harrier, the first VTOL jet fighter bomber. Folland Gnat test flying and production moved to Dunsfold from Chilbolton, Hampshire, in 1961.  Final assembly of the Harrier and the Hawk trainer aircraft was at Dunsfold.

Hawker Siddeley became part of British Aerospace in 1977. On 2 July 1986, British Aerospace's deputy chief test pilot Jim Hawkins was killed at Dunsfold when his developmental Hawk 200 crashed. On 24 June 1999, British Aerospace announced the closure of Dunsfold as part of a restructuring; Hawk final assembly had been transferred to Warton in 1988, the BAe Sea Harrier production finished in 1998 and the Harrier 2+ production was moved to Brough in 2000. The gate guardian aircraft – Hawker P.1127 XP984 – was moved to Brooklands Museum on long-term loan.

21st century

In 2002, BAE Systems (British Aerospace's successor) sold Dunsfold Aerodrome to The Rutland Group, which formed Dunsfold Park Ltd. Since mid-2002 the BBC motoring show Top Gear has been recorded at the park using a hangar as a studio and parts of the runways and taxiways of the aerodrome as the test track.

The track is also used to host cycle races in the summer months as part of a closed circuit series in the Surrey Cycle Racing League.

From 2005 to 2019, Dunsfold Park was home to Wings and Wheels, an annual air and motor show that is typically held in late August. The airshow attracted over 25,000 visitors and raised over £80,000 for charities including Help for Heroes and the Surrey & Sussex Air Ambulance in 2009. Increasing popularity has meant the event is now a two-day show.

Dunsfold Park Ltd also organises a drive-in cinema, Dunsfold Drive-In, over the Easter bank holiday as well as a popular and classical concert, Strings & Wings.

On 22 October 2020, a second 747, Boeing 747-400 G-CIVW, joined G-BDXJ, to be situated at Dunsfold for use as a filming location and for specialist training. It previously belonged to British Airways and arrived at the aerodrome from Cardiff Airport. On 5 December 2020, a third 747, G-BNLY, was moved from Cardiff to Dunsfold, for use as a filming location and trainer aircraft. This airframe is one of three Retrojet 747s previously used by BA, wearing the 1980's - 1997 Landor Associates livery, and has the name City of Swansea.

Aviation use controversy

Dunsfold Park's existing lawful use is in part as an aerodrome under a series of temporary planning consents which contain restrictions on the levels of aircraft movement and restrict flying to certain times.  However, the long-term and permanent underlying use has been a matter of considerable dispute between the owners and the council. In April 2011, Dunsfold Park claimed that the use of the site for aviation was entirely unrestricted on the grounds that the use predated the introduction of the planning acts or alternatively that a 60-year-old planning consent dating from 1951 allowed the unrestricted use of the aerodrome for aviation. The claim led to objections from parties such as all the local parish councils and bodies such as the Council to Protect Rural England and Friends of the Earth, and concern was expressed by local MPs.

In June 2011, Waverley Borough Council refused Dunsfold Park Ltd's application for a certificate of lawful use as an aerodrome. Dunsfold appealed but the appeal was rejected in April 2012.  When rejecting the appeal the inspector made reference to the old planning consent granted in 1951 for "erection, repair and flight testing of aircraft" stating that it was now agreed by all parties that "it was and is a permanent permission" and that the use at Dunsfold would revert to the 1951 consent, in 2018 on expiry of the existing temporary consents. In April 2014, Lord Justice Sullivan, at the High Court, said the 1951 permission for "flight testing" did not amount to consent for unrestricted flying.

Housing development

In 2006, the owners of Dunsfold Aerodrome proposed the construction of a new settlement with 2,600 homes on the site, a school, health services, public transport and road links to the A281, and an expanded business district. The project was designed to be an exemplar of green and sustainable living.

In late 2007, Dunsfold Park Ltd. applied to have its plans for the new town selected as one of the then Labour government's proposed eco-towns. On 3 April 2008 Dunsfold Park was one of over 40 proposals denied eco-town status by the then housing minister Caroline Flint. The government's summary assessment said that the bid was too small in terms of house numbers, because the proposal at Dunsfold was for only 2,600 houses whereas the minimum size for an eco-town was 5,000.  The assessment also said that the public transport offering needed further work.

In May 2008, Dunsfold Park Limited applied to Waverley Borough Council for planning consent for the eco-settlement.   It was opposed by local residents, Surrey County Council, four borough councils and 13 parish councils as well as the South East England Regional Assembly and the South East England Development Agency.  It received support from Age Concern Waverley, Guildford Labour Party, Farnham Labour Party, Cranleigh Labour Party and the former Lib Dem MP for Guildford, Sue Doughty.  It also received support from some environmentalists, including leading national authorities on sustainable living such as Professor Roland Clift and from national Friends of the Earth, for its innovative approach and contribution to sustainable development. Friends of the Earth also supported the development on the basis that re-development as an eco-settlement would remove the threat of aviation expansion at Dunsfold once and for all. However, the proposal was refused planning permission by the local borough council (Waverley) and in 2009 rejected on appeal by the then secretary of state John Denham.

Although the owner says it still hopes to persuade the authorities that eco-settlement remains the best long-term future for the site, it says it is now concentrating on expanding and promoting the underlying aviation potential of the aerodrome, which is still in operational use.

In December 2016, planning permission was granted for 1,800 homes to be built on the current site of the aerodrome. As part of the redevelopment, it is proposed that the track and associated aerodrome infrastructure such as the runway drag strip be demolished.

Memorial
A memorial, funded by public subscription, was erected outside the nearby Alfold Barn pub (on the A281 road between Guildford and Horsham) with the permission of Alfold Parish Council. Dunsfold Parish Council declined to host the memorial.

The memorial and its unveiling on 20 July 1992, exactly 50 years to the day after the first aircraft (an RCAF Tiger Moth) landed at Dunsfold, was organised by the Dunsfold Society of Mssrs Alan Barrett, Paul McCue, Gareth Morgan, Peter Robinson and Brian Spencer. A Tiger Moth and Lockheed P-3 Orion (of present-day 320 Sqn RDNAS) performed fly-pasts.

Museum
A museum housing a collection of WW2 Dunsfold memorabilia is maintained on site (open on Wednesdays to the public) by volunteers; the museum was started by the late Reg Day who served with 98 Sqn RAF at Dunsfold in 1943–44.

Incidents and accidents
On January 7, 1944, two RAF bombers collided near Dunsfold and were brought down.

On 20 November 1975, a Hawker Siddeley HS.125 G-BCUX was taking off on a test flight from runway 07. Just as aircraft became airborne, it was struck by birds. The pilots tried to land back onto the runway but the aircraft overran the runway and struck a passing car on the A281 road. The aircraft stopped in a field and was destroyed by fire. All six people inside the car died, and one crew member out of nine passengers and crew was injured.

On 2 July 1986, British Aerospace's deputy chief test pilot Jim Hawkins was killed at Dunsfold when his developmental Hawk 200 ZG200 crashed into farmland just beyond the road outside the airfield's southern boundary.

On 5 June 1998, a Hawker Hunter (G-HHUN) crashed at Dunsfold prior to that weekend's airshow. The pilot, John Davies, was killed.

On 12 June 2014, a Hughes 300 (G-BWAV) crashed just to the left of runway 25. The pilot sustained no major injuries.

Appearances in media

A Boeing 747-200 which served with British Airways until 2002 as City of Birmingham, G-BDXJ, was purchased by Aces High Limited, a company specialising in supplying aircraft for television and film work, and transferred to Dunsfold. It was modified and used for filming for the 2006 James Bond film Casino Royale. Some of the scenes set at Miami International Airport were filmed at Dunsfold. The aircraft has also appeared in the background of numerous Science in Action and Top Gear episodes and directly in an episode where it was towed by a JCB Fastrac tractor, and in many other programmes and commercials. It was also towed by a Volkswagen Touareg in a 2006 Fifth Gear episode, the same year that the modified aircraft and Dunsfold Airfield were featured in a television advertisement filmed for the Volkswagen Touareg, demonstrating the vehicle's towing ability. Modifications to the aircraft include the removal of the existing Rolls-Royce engines and replacement with twin mount engines. The aircraft has also featured in Primeval, the 2009 BBC production of The Day of the Triffids, and in RED 2.

References

External links
Dunsfold Aerodrome Website
Aces High Website
Dunsfold Airfield History Society Website

Aircraft assembly plants in England
Airports in South East England
Buildings and structures in Surrey
Hawker Siddeley
Royal Canadian Air Force stations
World War II airfields in the United Kingdom